This is a list of international sporting events in the United Arab Emirates.

Single sport events

Annual sport events

Entertainment events in the United Arab Emirates
United Arab Emirates
Events
events